is a railway station on the Tokyo Metro Tozai Line in Edogawa, Tokyo, Japan, operated by the Tokyo subway operator Tokyo Metro.

Lines
Kasai Station is served by the Tokyo Metro Tozai Line, and is numbered T-17.

Station layout
The station consists of two elevated side platforms. The station also has two center express tracks used for rapid service trains to bypass local trains at this station.

Platforms

History
The station opened on 29 March 1969.

The station facilities were inherited by Tokyo Metro after the privatization of the Teito Rapid Transit Authority (TRTA) in 2004.

Surrounding area

The station has the world's largest fully automated parking lot for bicycles where about 9,400 bicycles are automatically parked in its 15 metre deep basement. Each of the automatic elevators at the parking lot can handle up to 180-190 and it takes just 23 seconds to retrieve the bicycle.

The Tokyo Metro Museum is also located beneath the platforms of Kasai station and was opened in 1986.

References

External links

 Tokyo Metro station information 

Stations of Tokyo Metro
Tokyo Metro Tozai Line
Railway stations in Tokyo
Railway stations in Japan opened in 1969
1969 establishments in Japan